= Train depot (disambiguation) =

Train depot or railway depot may refer to:

- Motive power depot or traction maintenance depot, a place where usually locomotives are housed when not being used, and also repaired and maintained
- Railway station, in North American English
